The Sale of Goods Act, 1930 is a commercial law in Bangladesh.

The law was influenced by the Sale of Goods Act 1893, but has several additional provisions. Enacted during the British Raj, the law remains largely untouched. It was re-enacted after Bangladesh's independence.

Content
The law includes important definitions, essential elements of contract for the sale of goods, stipulation of sales, transfer of ownership, conditions and warranties, Performance of Contract of sale, remedial measures, auction sale and rules regarding delivery.

See also
Sale of Goods Act 1979
Unfair Contract Terms Act
Contract Act, 1872 (Bangladesh)
Patent and Designs Act 1911

References

Law of Bangladesh